Calamopteryx is a genus of viviparous brotulas.

Species
There are currently three recognized species in this genus:
 Calamopteryx goslinei J. E. Böhlke & Cohen, 1966 (Longarm brotula)
 Calamopteryx jeb Cohen, 1973
 Calamopteryx robinsorum Cohen, 1973 (Teacher brotula)

References

Bythitidae
Taxa named by Eugenia Brandt Böhlke